Steffen Højer (born 22 May 1973) is a Danish professional football coach and former player, who is the head coach of the Danish national under-21 football team.

Højer spent most of his career with Viborg FF, although he also played for a number of other Danish clubs, and most notably won the 1998–99 Danish Superliga with AaB. A prolific striker in the Superliga, he finished league top scorer three years in row in the 2003–04 (joint), 2004–05 and 2005–06 seasons. He played one match for the Danish national team.

On 7 January 2008, the day of his retirement from his career as a professional footballer, Højer started as head of sport in Viborg FF.

Playing career
Born in Viborg, Højer made his senior debut for hometown club Viborg FF in the Danish 1st Division in 1992. Through four years at the club, Højer and Viborg struggled to get a foothold in the top-flight Danish Superliga. When they succeeded in the 1995–96 season, Højer scored 16 goals in 32 games, and was sold to league rivals Aalborg Boldspilklub (AaB). He made his debut for the Danish national team, when he was substituted into an August 1996 match against Sweden for the last ten minutes of play. He was an immediate success at AaB, though he did not score as many goals as he did for Viborg FF. In his final year of contract at AaB, he helped the club win the 1998–99 Danish championship. He did not play much that season due to stiff competition from Norwegian player Frank Strandli and fellow Dane Søren Frederiksen, which prompted Højer to look for a new club.

He signed a contract with Italian club Brescia Calcio and was loaned out from AaB to Viborg FF, while awaiting his AaB contract to expire in the summer 1999. At Viborg, he played four games before he suffered a knee injury, which meant he started his Italian career injured. His stay at Brescia was short, and he never played a game for the club. He moved back to Denmark in 2000, in order to play the season out at Danish 1st Division team FC Midtjylland. He helped the club win promotion to the Superliga, before moving back to play with childhood club Viborg FF. Not regaining his former goal scoring prowess, lacklustre play in the first half of the 2002–03 season meant that Højer was sold to Odense BK in January 2003. At Odense, he looked to replace league top scorer Kaspar Dalgas, who had been sold to Brøndby IF before that season.

Højer rediscovered his goal scoring form at Odense, as he finished the 2003–04 season as joint top scorer with Mohamed Zidan, Mwape Miti and Tommy Bechmann. He was the sole top scorer of the 2004–05 season. As Højer still lived in Viborg, he decided to once again play for Viborg FF when his contract expired following the 2004–05 season. In his first season back at Viborg FF, he set the record of three consecutive Superliga top scorer titles, improving Peter Møller's former record of two, set in the 1991–92 and 1992–93 seasons.

Steffen Højer scored 125 goals in Danish Superliga.

Coaching career 

On 9 January 2023, Højer was appointed as the manager of the Danish national under-21 football team, signing a contract until the summer of 2025 and stepping up from his previous role as assistant manager, following Jesper Sørensen's departure.

Honours
 Danish Superliga: 1998–99
 Danish Superliga top scorer: 2003–04, 2004–05, 2005–06

References

External links

 AaB profile
Career stats at Danmarks Radio

1973 births
Living people
People from Viborg Municipality
Danish men's footballers
Association football forwards
Denmark international footballers
Denmark under-21 international footballers
Danish Superliga players
AaB Fodbold players
Viborg FF players
FC Midtjylland players
Odense Boldklub players
Brescia Calcio players
Danish expatriate men's footballers
Expatriate footballers in Italy
Danish expatriate sportspeople in Italy
Danish football managers
Viborg FF managers
Danish 1st Division managers
Sportspeople from the Central Denmark Region